William Hepburn Armstrong (September 7, 1824 – May 14, 1919) was an American politician from Pennsylvania who served as a Republican member of the U.S. House of Representatives for Pennsylvania's 18th congressional district from 1869 to 1871.

William H. Armstrong was born in Williamsport, Pennsylvania.  He graduated from Princeton College in 1847.  He studied law, was admitted to the bar and commenced practice in Williamsport.  He served in the Pennsylvania State House of Representatives in 1860 and 1861.  He declined a commission as president judge of the twenty-sixth judicial circuit of Pennsylvania in 1862.

Armstrong was elected as a Republican to the Forty-first Congress.  He was an unsuccessful candidate for reelection in 1870.  He declined the office of commissioner of Indian affairs tendered by President Ulysses S. Grant.  He served as commissioner of railroads from 1882 to 1885.  He resumed the practice of law in Washington, D.C., and Philadelphia, until 1898, when he retired from active business pursuits.  He moved to Wilmington, Delaware, where he died in 1919.  Interment in Wilmington and Brandywine Cemetery.

Sources

External links
 
 
 William Hepburn Armstrong at The Political Graveyard
 

Burials at Wilmington and Brandywine Cemetery
Republican Party members of the Pennsylvania House of Representatives
Pennsylvania lawyers
Politicians from Williamsport, Pennsylvania
Princeton University alumni
1824 births
1919 deaths
Lawyers from Philadelphia
Republican Party members of the United States House of Representatives from Pennsylvania
19th-century American politicians
19th-century American lawyers